The 2019 World Minifootball Federation World Cup was the third edition of the WMF World Cup, the world championship for men's national minifootball teams organized by the World Minifootball Federation. The tournament was contested in Perth, Western Australia, from 1 to 11 October 2019.

Venue
All the matches of 2019 WMF World Cup are played in the Perth Minifoot Stadium in Langley Park in Perth.

Teams and draw

Qualified teams
Unlike in the 2017 WMF World Cup, 32 teams from 5 continents are qualified for the final tournament:

Africa:
 
 
 
 
 

Americas:
 
 
 
 
 
 
 
 

Asia:
 
 
 
 
 
 
 
 

Europe:
 
 
 
 
 
 
 
 
 
 

Oceania:
  (Host Nation)

Draw
On 7 June 2019, in Perth, the pools were drawn for 8 groups of 32 teams.

Group stage

Group A

Group B

Group C

Group D

Group E

Group F

Group G

Group H

Knockout stage

Bracket

Round of 16

Quarter-finals

Semi-finals

Third-place match

Final

Final ranking

Top scorers

Source:

Disciplinary ranking

Top teams
Best Defence 

Best Attack

Clean play

References

External links
 World Minifooball Federation official website
 World Cup 2019 website

2019
International association football competitions hosted by Australia
WMF
Sports competitions in Perth, Western Australia
WMF